Kotalpokhar (code:KLP) is a railway station located in the town of Kotalpukur, Jharkhand. It is situated at Barharwa Tehsil village in Sahebganj district in the indian state of Jharkhand.

References

Railway stations in Sahibganj district
Howrah railway division